The Marshall Sklare Award is an annual honor of the Association for the Social Scientific Study of Jewry (ASSJ). The ASSJ seeks to recognize "a senior scholar who has made a significant scholarly contribution to the social scientific study of Jewry." In most cases, the recipient has given a scholarly address. In recent years, the honored scholar has presented the address at the annual meeting of the Association for Jewish Studies.

In 2020, in honor of the 50th anniversary of the organization, the ASSJ board chose to break the precedent of honoring one person per year and named two honorees, both of whom were founders of the ASSJ.

The award is named in memory of the "founding father of American Jewish sociology" Marshall Sklare (1921-1992), who had been Klutznick Family Professor of Contemporary Jewish Studies and Sociology at Brandeis University.

Recipients
Past recipients, fields of study, and the titles of their scholarly papers have been:
 1992, Sidney Goldstein, Demography, "Beyond the 1990 National Jewish Population Survey: A Research Agenda"
 1993, Seymour Martin Lipset, Sociology, "Some Thoughts on the Past, Present and Future of American Jewry"
 1994, Celia Heller, History
 1995, Daniel Elazar, Political Science, "The Future of American Jewry"
 1996, Samuel Klausner, Sociology
 1997, Walter Zenner, Anthropology, "The Ethnography of Diaspora: Studying Syrian Jewry"
 1998, Bernard Reisman, Communal Service, "Redefining Jewish Identity in North America"
 1999, Sergio DellaPergola, Demography, "Thoughts of a Jewish Demographer in the Year 2000"
 2000, Charles Liebman, Political Science, "Some Research Proposals for the Study of American Jews"
 2001, Calvin Goldscheider, Sociology and Demography, "Social Science and the Jews: A Research Agenda for the Next Generation"
 2002, Jonathan Sarna, History, "From Past to Present: Contemporary Lessons from the Study of American Judaism"
 2003, Samuel Heilman, Sociology, "How did Fundamentalism Manage to Infiltrate Contemporary Orthodoxy?"
 2004, Egon Mayer, Sociology
 2005, Elihu Katz, Communications, "Two Dilemmas of Religious Identity and Practice among Israeli Jews"
 2006, Deborah Dash Moore, History,  "On City Streets"
 2007, Barry R. Chiswick, Economics, "The Rise and Fall of the Jewish Ph.D."
 2008, Paul Ritterband, Sociology, "Smart Jews"
 2009, Charles Kadushin, Social Network Analysis, "Social Networks and Jews"
 2010, Steven M. Cohen, Sociology, "The Demise of the 'Good Jew'"
 2011, Riv-Ellen Prell, Anthropology, "Boundaries, Margins and Norms: The Intellectual Stakes in the Study of American Jewish Culture(s)"
 2012, Leonard Saxe, Social Psychology, "Reflections on the Science of the Social Scientific Study of Jewry"
 2013, Morton Weinfeld, Sociology, "If Canada and Israel are at War, Who Gets My Support? Challenges of Competing Diaspora Loyalties"
 2014, Sylvia Barack Fishman, Sociology, "American Jewishness Today: Identity and Transmissibility in an Open World"
 2015, Barbara Kirshenblatt-Gimblett, Performance Studies, "The Ethnographer in the Museum: Creating the Polin Museum of the History of Polish Jews"
 2016, Bruce Phillips, Sociology, "Beyond Policy: Reviving Jewish Demography through Local Population Studies"
 2017, Judit Bokser Liwerant, Political Science, "Latin American Jews in a Transnational World: Conceptual Paths and Shifting Paradigms"
 2018, Arnold Eisen, Religious Studies, "Boomers, Millennials, and the Shape of American Judaism"
 2019, Harriet Hartman, Sociology, "How Gender and Family Still Matter for Contemporary Jewry"
 2020, Arnold Dashefsky, Sociology, and Chaim Waxman, Sociology
 2021, Ariela Keysar, Demography, and Barry Kosmin, Demography
 2022, Debra Kaufman, Sociology and Women's Studies

See also

 List of social sciences awards

References

External links
Sklare Award
Association for the Social Scientific Study of Jewry

American awards
Social sciences awards
Judaic studies